Gold fingerprinting is a method of identifying an item made of gold based on the impurities or trace elements it contains.

Importance 
This technique has been used to lay claim to stolen or relocated gold, including gold that has undergone salting can be identified by its multiple sources. Gold fingerprinting also assists in understanding the origins of gold artifacts. 

This method is used to characterize gold or a gold-containing item by its trace elements, a.k.a. fingerprinting the sample by mineralizing event and to the particular mine or bullion source. Elements that measure above the detection limits include : Ag, Cu, Ti, Fe, Pt, Pd, Mn, Cr, Ni, Sn, Hg, Pb, As and Te can be used for gold fingerprinting and geochemical characterization. In order for this technique to be used to identify the origins of the gold in question a database made from fingerprinting samples of gold from mines and bullion sources is required.

Method
Electron microprobe (EMP), Synchrotron micro-XRF (SR-M-XRF), Time-of-flight secondary ion mass spectrometry (TOF-SIMS), Laser induced breakdown spectroscopy (LIBS), Atomic emission spectrometry, x-ray fluorescence spectrometry with higher energy synchrotron radiation (SR-XFS) and Laser ablation-Inductively coupled plasma mass spectrometry (LA-ICP-MS)  are all methods of gold fingerprinting.

The most common method is LA-ICP-MS primarily because it is quasi-nondestructive, allowing for the preservation of the samples and convenient as samples require little to no preparation. Laser ablation allows for high spatial resolution sampling while the inductively coupled plasma mass spectrometry provides high sensitivity to identify extremely small amounts of trace elements within the gold. This method can also be conducted outside of a lab with the assistance of a portable device that uses a diode pumped solid state laser and fiber-optics, making fingerprinting more convenient as it eliminates the need for transfer of gold to a specific lab.

Advantages of LA-ICP-MS include reduced sample preparation, no sample size requirements, reduced spectral interference and increased sample throughput. Over the past 32 years, LA-ICP-MS has been used for archaeological, biological and forensic purposes. For example a group of gold foil fragments dating back to the 5th Century B.C.E. were analysized by LA-ICP-MS uncovering information on their manufacturing process, function and relationship to one another.

Complications 
LA-ICP-MS function optimally with gold particles greater than 60 μm in diameter to avoid any contamination during measurements. Although LA-ICP-MS has a lower detection limit, its overall precision was lower than other analysis techniques for trace element concentrations such as field emission-electron probe microanalysis (FE-EPMA) and synchrotron micro X-ray fluorescence spectroscopy (SR-l-XRF). 

Due to the small size of gold (<5μm-250μm) small fragments of minerals need to be separated from the gold before analysis can occur.

Gold fingerprinting has limitations including elemental fractionation (the non-sample related analyte) and calibration requires matrix-matched standards.

A few other problems exist that limit actual sourcing or provencancing of gold in relation to manufactured art objects. These problems include: a lack of an extensive database of elemental profiles in gold ores, the natural differences that coexist in ore geology and the difficulties of accurately analyzing trace elements. Also, trading, looting and re-melting of so called “precious” metal objects add to the problem of sourcing.

See also
Gold laundering

References

 RJ Watling, HK Herbert, D Delev, ID Abell. "Gold fingerprinting by laser ablation inductively coupled plasma mass spectrometry". Spectrochimica Acta, Part B: Atomic Spectroscopy, 1994, 49, 205–219. .

Gold